Eisner Iván Loboa Balanta (born 17 May 1987) is a Colombian-born Mexican footballer who plays as a midfielder for El Salvador club Municipal Limeño. He also holds Mexican citizenship.

Career
Loboa began his career in 2006 for top tier Categoría Primera A side Deportivo Cali as a defensive midfielder. He was considered a good enough talent to be included in the Colombian U-20 squad that played in the 2007 South American Youth Championship that finished sixth within the tournament and failed to qualify for the 2007 FIFA U-20 World Cup. When he returned he was unable to establish himself as first team regular and in 2010 he would join second tier Categoría Primera B side Deportivo Pasto.

On July 9, 2011 he joined Chinese top tier side Shanghai Shenhua on loan for six mouths to see him play out the rest of the Chinese league season. He would immediately be included in the club's first team and within five days make his debut as a substitute in a 1−1 draw with Liaoning Whowin. After the game Loboa would struggle to establish himself within the team and would often be used as a substitute, he would however score his debut goal against Jiangsu Sainty in a 3-2 defeat before leaving.

After his loan period ended he would permanently join top tier Mexican side Club León half way through the 2011–12 Mexican league season.

Honours
León
Liga de Ascenso:Clausura 2012
Liga MX (2): Apertura 2013, Clausura 2014

Puebla F.C
Copa Mx (1):

References

External links

eltricolor.com.mx

Living people
1989 births
Sportspeople from Cauca Department
Colombian footballers
Colombia under-20 international footballers
Colombian expatriate footballers
Naturalized citizens of Mexico
Categoría Primera A players
Campeonato Brasileiro Série A players
Chinese Super League players
Liga MX players
Ascenso MX players
Ecuadorian Serie A players
Deportivo Cali footballers
Deportivo Pasto footballers
Shanghai Shenhua F.C. players
Club León footballers
Club Puebla players
Atlas F.C. footballers
Atlético Morelia players
América Futebol Clube (MG) players
América de Cali footballers
C.D. Olmedo footballers
Association football defenders
Association football midfielders
Colombian expatriate sportspeople in China
Colombian expatriate sportspeople in Mexico
Colombian expatriate sportspeople in Brazil
Colombian expatriate sportspeople in Ecuador
Expatriate footballers in China
Expatriate footballers in Mexico
Expatriate footballers in Brazil
Expatriate footballers in Ecuador